Anaerobacter is a genus of Gram-positive bacteria related to Clostridium. They are anaerobic chemotrophs and are unusual spore-formers as they produce more than one spore per bacterial cell (up to five). They fix nitrogen. Their G+C content is 29%.
Only one species of this genus (Anaerobacter polyendosporus) has been described.

References

Clostridiaceae
Monotypic bacteria genera
Bacteria genera